"MMMBop" is a song written and performed by American pop rock band Hanson. It was released on April 15, 1997, as the lead single from their debut full-length studio album, Middle of Nowhere (1997). The song was nominated for two Grammys at the 40th Annual Grammy Awards and is the band's most successful single to date. "MMMBop" was a major success worldwide, reaching number one in at least 12 countries, including Australia, Canada, Germany, New Zealand, the United Kingdom and the United States.

The song was voted the best single of the year in The Village Voice Pazz & Jop critics poll, while also topping critics' polls from such media as Rolling Stone, Spin, and VH1, and was ranked number 20 on VH1's "100 Greatest Songs of the 90s", as well as number 98 on VH1's "100 Greatest Songs of the Past 25 Years".

Background and composition
The song originally appeared on the 1996 independent album MMMBop with a slower tempo, but was reworked as an upbeat pop track by hit producers the Dust Brothers. This became the hit version. In an August 2004 interview with Songfacts, Zac Hanson explained the song's origins:

"MMMBop" is written and composed in the key of A major.

Critical reception
Larry Flick from Billboard wrote, "The rush of youth-driven acts on radio accelerates with the onset of this candy-coated pop confection. Try to imagine what the Jackson 5 might sound like with the accompaniment of a skittling funk beat and scratchy faux-grunge guitars, and you will have a clear picture of where Hanson is coming from. Initially it's a mildly jarring combination, but it's ultimately quite cool. Factor in an instantly catchy chorus, and you have the making of a runaway smash." A reviewer from Scottish Daily Record noted, "They're about half the age of the Spice Girls, but Hanson can sing, play their own instruments and string a sentence together. It must be their American upbringing." Sara Scribner from Los Angeles Times viewed it as "a lighthearted dollop of nonsensical pop." British magazine Music Week gave the song four out of five, stating that "media attention is sky high for these three Tulsa brothers, aged 11, 14 and 16. And this cutesy, catchy pop song is the ideal debut single to cash in on that interest." 

Chuck Eddy of Rolling Stone felt it "sticks in your brain like Trident in your shag carpet." He explained, "Built on a turntable-scratch update of the soul rhythms that served as turn-of-the-'70s bubblegum rock's secret weapon, the song is as unintelligible as it is indelible. Its hooks suburbanize the Jackson 5 as expertly as the Osmonds used to, but whether its quivering lyrics really deal with chewing (a favorite bubble entendre since the Ohio Express' "Chewy Chewy") is anybody's guess." Ian Hyland from Sunday Mirror rated the song eight out of ten, commenting, "Teenage brothers from America who sound a bit like Sheryl Crow on helium. You'll love this at first, but in a few weeks you'll be kicking the TV in whenever their smiley faces appear." David Sinclair from The Times concluded, "No 1 in America and all over British radio like a rash, it sounds like a gilt-edged pop standard already."

"MMMBop" was voted the best single of the year in The Village Voice Pazz & Jop critics poll, while also topping critics' polls from such media as Rolling Stone, Spin, and VH1, and was ranked number 20 on VH1's "100 Greatest Songs of the 90s", as well as number 98 on VH1's "100 Greatest Songs of the Past 25 Years". In 2021, Rolling Stone ranked it as the ninth-best boy band song of all time.

Music video
A music video was produced to promote the single, directed by American film, television and music video director Tamra Davis. It features the Hanson brothers singing and playing their instruments in a suburban living room. In between, there are clips of them entering a cave, ending up on a beach. Other scenes show them playing around in a city, dancing on the Moon, driving a car or appearing in old footage of Albert Einstein.

Track listings
All songs were written by Isaac Hanson, Taylor Hanson, and Zac Hanson. Additional songwriters are noted in parentheses.

 US and Australian CD and cassette single
 "MMMBop" (radio version) – 3:50
 "MMMBop" (Dust Brothers mix) – 4:29

 US 7-inch single
A. "MMMBop" – 4:27
B. "Where's the Love"  – 4:12

 US 12-inch single
A1. "MMMBop" (Berman Brothers club mix) – 5:14
A2. "MMMBop" (Berman Brothers club instrumental) – 5:14
B1. "MMMBop" (soulful club mix) – 5:27
B2. "MMMBop" (Berman Brothers radio mix) – 3:17
B3. "MMMBop" – 4:27

 UK CD single
 "MMMBop" (single version) – 3:50
 "MMMBop" (album version) – 4:27
 "MMMBop" (Dust Brothers mix) – 4:29
 "MMMBop" (Hex mix) – 3:25

 UK cassette single and European CD single
 "MMMBop" (single version) – 3:50
 "MMMBop" (album version) – 4:27

 Japanese CD single
 "MMMBop" (single version) – 3:59
 "MMMBop" (album version) – 4:27
 "MMMBop" (Dust Brothers mix) – 4:29
 "MMMBop" (dub mix) – 4:20

Charts

Weekly charts

Year-end charts

Decade-end charts

Certifications

Release history

Notable cover versions
Twenty years after the first recording of "MMMBop", approximately 93,000 cover versions of the song were counted by MTV reporter Patrick Hosken in March 2016, as represented on YouTube. The Hansons told Rebecca Milzoff at Vulture that they had not heard any good cover versions, because "People can't sing the chorus right. Most of the time they syncopate it wrong," according to Isaac Hanson. Later that year, Postmodern Jukebox recorded a cover in the style of 1950s swinging doo-wop with four male singers; picking up 1.5 million views on YouTube in the first year. In July 2019, the official Hanson Twitter feed shared a video by Scary Pockets, a band founded by keyboardist Jack Conte. The Scary Pockets version was fronted by Lucy Schwartz on lead vocals, and Adam Neely covered the electric bass.

References

1996 songs
1997 debut singles
Billboard Hot 100 number-one singles
European Hot 100 Singles number-one singles
Hanson (band) songs
Irish Singles Chart number-one singles
Mercury Records singles
Music videos directed by Tamra Davis
Number-one singles in Australia
Number-one singles in Austria
Number-one singles in Denmark
Number-one singles in Germany
Number-one singles in Hungary
Number-one singles in New Zealand
Number-one singles in Scotland
Number-one singles in Sweden
Number-one singles in Switzerland
RPM Top Singles number-one singles
Song recordings produced by Dust Brothers
Songs written by Isaac Hanson
Songs written by Taylor Hanson
Songs written by Zac Hanson
UK Singles Chart number-one singles
Ultratop 50 Singles (Flanders) number-one singles